Cole County Historical Society Building, also known as the B. Gratz Brown House, is a historic building located at Jefferson City, Cole County, Missouri. It was built in 1871, and is a two-story, Victorian style, brick rowhouse.  It is three bays wide and features segmental arched windows.  It was renovated in 1948.

It was listed on the National Register of Historic Places in 1969. It is located in the Missouri State Capitol Historic District.

References

Individually listed contributing properties to historic districts on the National Register in Missouri
Buildings and structures on the National Register of Historic Places in Missouri
Victorian architecture in Missouri
Buildings and structures completed in 1871
Buildings and structures in Jefferson City, Missouri
National Register of Historic Places in Cole County, Missouri